The 2018–19 season is Dinamo Zagreb's 28th season in the Croatian First Division and 106th year in existence as a football club. The season covers the period from 1 July 2018 to 30 June 2019.

Dinamo will be defending their title as league champions, as well as their title as cup winners. They will also compete in the 2018–19 UEFA Champions League, entering the second qualifying round.

The club's manager is Nenad Bjelica, who will be in his first full-season with the club.

Review

Pre-season 
On 23 June, Dinamo played their first friendly match of the pre-season, beating Macedonian side Rabotnički Skoplje, winning 4–0, with Mario Šitum (2), Dino Perić and Antonio Marin scoring the goals. Five days later, on 28 June, Dinamo played Azerbaijani side Qabala, winning 2–0, with Ivan Šunjić and Antonio Marin scoring the goals. The following players officially joined the club: Emir Dilaver (from Lech Poznań), Damian Kądzior (from Górnik Zabrze), Marin Leovac (from PAOK) and Mislav Oršić (from Uslan Hyundai), Lovro Majer (from feeder-club NK Lokomotiva) and Kévin Théophile-Catherine (from AS Saint-Étienne). The following players left the club: Borna Sosa (to Stuttgart), Ante Ćorić (to Roma) and El Arabi Hillal Soudani (to Nottingham Forrest) and the club will earn a combined €18m from their transfers. On 3 July, Dinamo trashed Austria Klagenfurt in a 6–1 win; with Armin Hodžić, Ivan Šunjić, Izet Hajrović, Filip Benković, Luka Menalo and Amer Gojak scoring one goal each. A day later, on 4 July, Dinamo beat Triglav 4–0 with Mario Šitum, Ivan Fiolić, Dani Olmo and Mario Budimir scoring the goals. Three days later, on 7 July, Dinamo beat Polish side Cracovia following Kamil Pestka's own goal in the 90th minute of the game. On 18 July, Dinamo drew 0–0 with feeder-team Sesvete. This was followed by a 2–1 away win over Varaždin in the last friendly game of the season, with goals from Armin Hodžić and Dino Perić, on 20 July.

July 
On 24 July, in the first leg of the 2018–19 UEFA Champions League second qualifying phase, Dinamo beat Israeli club Hapoel Be'er Sheva by a scoreline of 5–0, despite media outlets calling Dinamo the underdogs of the match, as Hapoel had reached a historic 3–2 win over Inter Milan in the UEFA Europa League just two years prior. Dinamo won with goals coming from Izet Hajrović, Mislav Oršić, Arijan Ademi (2) and Armin Hodžić, taking a 5–0 lead into the second leg. On 28 July, in the first league match of the season, Dinamo drew 1–1 with Rudeš, initially going 0–1 down following Sadegh Moharrami's own goal, but a late equalizing goal from Dino Perić was enough to prevent defeat. In the second leg of the 2018–19 UEFA Champions second qualifying phase against Hapoel Be'er Sheva, Dinamo went 0–2 down by half-time, following a goal from John Ogu and Petar Stojanović's own goal. Dinamo eventually managed to draw the game 2–2 with goals from Mario Budimir and Izet Hajrović, confirming Dinamo's advancement into the next stage of the tournament qualifying phase.

August 

On 3 August, Dinamo beat Istra 1961 by a scoreline of 3–0; with two goals from Mario Gavranović and one goal from Marin Leovac. On 7 August, Dinamo beat Kazakhstani champions Astana in the first leg of the third qualifying round of the UEFA Champions League, winning 2–0 with goals from Mario Budimir and Dani Olmo, despite being considered underdogs prior to the match. On 9 August, Dinamo Zagreb confirmed that Filip Benković signed for Premier League club Leicester City, in a fee in the region of £13m.

Squad information

First-team squad

Transfers

Transfers In

Transfers Out

Loans Out

Transfer Summary

Friendlies

Pre-season

Competitions

Overall

Overview 

{| class="wikitable" style="text-align: center"
|-
!rowspan=2|Competition
!colspan=8|Record
|-
!
!
!
!
!
!
!
!
|-
| Prva HNL

|-
| Croatian Cup

|-
| UEFA Champions League

|-
| UEFA Europa League

|-
! Total

Prva HNL

Table

Summary

By matchday

Matches

Croatian Cup

UEFA Champions League

Second qualifying round

Third qualifying round

Play-off round

UEFA Europa League

Group stage

Group D

Knockout phase

Round of 32

Round of 16

Statistics

Appearances

Goalscorers

Clean Sheets

Disciplinary Record

Sponsorship 

 Lana Group (front shirt sponsors)
Ban Tours
Coca-Cola
Euroherc
VIP
Hrvatski Telekom
Mlinar
Ožujsko
Cammeo
Franck
adidas (kit manufacturers)

References 

GNK Dinamo Zagreb seasons
Dinamo Zagreb
Dinamo Zagreb
Dinamo Zagreb
2018-19